Chlorostrymon maesites, known generally as amethyst hairstreak, is a species of hairstreak in the butterfly family Lycaenidae. Other common names include the maesites hairstreak and verde azul hairstreak.

The MONA or Hodges number for Chlorostrymon maesites is 4271.

References

Further reading

 

Eumaeini
Articles created by Qbugbot